The Macedonian National Movement (abbreviated MANAPO) (transliterated: Makedonski Nacionalen Pokret) was a leftist movement started in 1936 among the progressive Macedonian students in the Belgrade, Zagreb and some other universities in interwar period. Numerous members of the groups subsequently joined Yugoslav Partisans with promient one being the future first president of independent Macedonia Kiro Gligorov. In 26 August 1936 at the University of Zagreb a group of Macedonian students belonging to the group signed the Political Declaration, an illegal document requesting political and social emancipation of Macedonians in the Kingdom of Yugoslavia.

MANAPO's aims were to help restore functional parliamentary democracy in the post-6 January Dictatorship Kingdom of Yugoslavia and to advocate for the right to self-determination of the Bulgarians in Vardar Macedonia. The mainstream historiography in the post war SFR Yugoslavia and present-day North Macedonia plays down the Bulgarian nature of this organization and claims that MANAPO's platform was based on the awaking of the Macedonian national conscience among the Macedonian Slavic-speaking population, the affirmation of Macedonian as well as fight against the Serbian hegemony.

When MANAPO was dissolved in the beginning of the Second World War, with some of its members entering the ranks of the Communist Party of Yugoslavia, while others felt the aims of the organization had been established with what they perceived as the "liberation" of Vardar Macedonia by Kingdom of Bulgaria in 1941 at the time of Invasion of Yugoslavia.

References

Political movements
Anti-fascist organizations
Organizations established in 1936